Win or Lose may refer to:

 "Win or Lose" (Zero Assoluto song), 2008
 "Win or Lose" (Mobb Deep song), 2004
 "Win or Lose", a song by Status Quo from Back to Back, 1983
 Win or Lose (TV series), 2023